The  is a suspension bridge in Nagasaki Prefecture, Japan. It connects the islands of Hirado and Kitamatsuura Peninsula. Completed in 1977, it has a main span of 465.5 meters and total length of 665 m. From April 1, 2010, no fee is required to pass the bridge.

See also
List of longest suspension bridge spans

References

External links
 Official homepage 
 Hirado City Official Website
 Picture of Hirado Bridge
 

Suspension bridges in Japan
Bridges completed in 1977